Temper is a 2015 Indian Telugu-language action film written by Vakkantham Vamsi and directed by Puri Jagannadh. Starring N. T. Rama Rao Jr., Kajal Aggarwal and Prakash Raj, the narrative revolves around Daya, a corrupt police officer, whose life changes after a brawl that eventually leads to him stumbling upon a murder case.

Temper was produced by Bandla Ganesh on Parameswara Art Productions banner. Anup Rubens composed the soundtrack while Mani Sharma composed the background score. Shyam K. Naidu and S. R. Sekhar handled the film's cinematography and editing, respectively. The film was made on a budget of 35 crore (350 million). Production began on 1 August 2014 at Hyderabad and principal photography commenced on the next day. After being halted twice because of the Film Federation employees' strike, the film's shoot was completed by 31 January 2015, with the film being primarily shot in and around Hyderabad and Goa.

The film was released worldwide on 13 February 2015 to positive reviews from critics, who praised the principal cast's performances and criticised portions of the film for being predictable and repetitive. The film was a commercial success and proved to be a major success for NTR Jr after a streak of failures, grossing 74.3 crore (743 million) and collecting a share of 43.1 crore (431 million) in its lifetime. It was remade in Hindi as Simmba (2018) and remade in Tamil as Ayogya (2019) with a changed climax.

Plot 
Daya, an orphan developed a preconceived idea during his childhood that a cop's life would be buoyant, having seen Police taking bribes and harbours an aspiration to become one. He grows to be a corrupt Sub-Inspector and gets transferred to Vishakapatnam and in cahoots with a local don Waltair Vasu, begins to earn a quick buck earning hatred from an honest constable Narayana Murthy when he releases Vasu's four younger brothers Ravi, Mani, Vamsi and Sundeep from prison when they were apprehended for smuggling. Elsewhere, he begins to woo Shanvi, a Blue Cross member who reciprocates his feelings. 

Vasu's henchmen abduct Shanvi on her birthday misinterpreting her to the girl they are supposed to carry off. Daya fights them to rescue her and Vasu clears the confusion with his arrival and lets go of Daya and Shanvi, apologizing to them. As her birthday gift, Shanvi requests Daya to save the actual target and obliged to her appeal, he saves the girl: Lakshmi much to Vasu's chagrin. Daya reconciles with Vasu, who agrees to relinquish his plans of killing the girl if Daya manages to get him a piece of evidence she holds against his brothers' atrocities.  

Daya talks with Lakshmi to learn that her younger sister, Deepthi was kidnapped, molested and killed after being subjected to torture for forty days by Vasu's brothers, who filmed all of it and stored the footage in a compact disc and Lakshmi managed to get it. Lakshmi entrusts Daya with the disc requesting him to get the culrpits punished while he arranges for her and her mother to leave for USA, where Lakshmi is a job-holder before Deepthi goes missing under pretext of their safety from Vasu and his henchmen. Daya learns that Lakshmi's mother was the one who approached him to file a missing complaint but he convinced her that she eloped with someone. She is unaware of all the things that Deepthi went through as Lakshmi chose to hide it. Daya drops Lakshmi and her mother at the airport where the former's conversation with him brings a change in Daya, who holds himself responsible for what has happened to Deepthi as the latter was abducted after Vasu's brothers were set free from prison by Daya.

Vasu's henchmen arrive at the station to retrieve the disc from Daya, who is notified by Murthy of the good in him, thrashes them and decides to get the foursome punished. Daya holds Shanvi accreditable for his reformation and reveals how corrupt he was to her but she chooses to forgive him as he finally has a change in his mindset. Meanwhile, Deepthi's corpse is discovered and the brutality of the crime stuns the people and even the doctor, who performed an autopsy on her. In court, Daya's lawyer produces the disc as evidence against the foursome but it turns out to be an empty one and Daya deduces that he is betrayed by his lawyer and regrets not making copies of it during his conversation with Shanvi. Lakshmi's mother, in USA suffers from a heart stroke after learning about Deepthi's death.

Daya takes a tough decision and in the court, next day, he adds that he has also assaulted Deepthi along with the four brothers so that they do not escape the death sentence. The statement surprises everyone including Shanvi and Murthy, with both of them refusing to trust it. The judge gives a death sentence to Daya and the four brothers while Lakshmi, learning about it contacts Murthy to reveal that she has an extra copy of the footage with her and even talks to the media about it. As a result, Daya's death penalty is cancelled while the four brothers initiate a brawl with the Police resulting in Daya fighting them off and killing the three of them while the fourth one commits suicide, fearing for Daya. Daya is released from prison, reinstated into Police service and reconciles with Shanvi and Murthy.

Cast 

 N. T. Rama Rao Jr. as S.I Daya, a Corrupt Police Officer
 Kajal Aggarwal as Shanvi
 Prakash Raj as Waltair Vasu
 Posani Krishna Murali as Head Constable Narayana Murthy
 Madhuurima as Lakshmi
 Apoorva Srinivasan as Deepthi
 Subbaraju as Ravi
 Amit Tiwari as Mani
 Kota Srinivasa Rao as Judge
 Ali as Chain Snatcher
 Sapthagiri as Chain Snatcher
 Tanikella Bharani as Venkat Rao
 Sonia Agarwal as Doctor
 Pavitra Lokesh as Lakshmi's mother
 Kovai Sarala as Shanvi's mother
 Rama Prabha as Shanvi's grandmother
 Jaya Prakash Reddy as Home Minister of Andhra Pradesh
 Vennela Kishore as Vennela Kishore
 Narsing Yadav as Police Officer
 Mukhtar Khan as Police Officer
 Raghu Babu as Jaani Bhai
 Junaid Sheikh as Shiva
 Raghu Karumanchi as Madhav
 Vamsi as Vamsi
 Ajaz Khan
 Nora Fatehi in the item number Ittage Rechchipodam

Production

Development 
After Andhrawala (2004), Puri Jagannadh and N. T. Rama Rao Jr. unsuccessfully tried to collaborate for another movie several times. When reports of their second collaboration emerged in early 2014, neither of them confirmed the reports. During the post-release promotions of Heart Attack (2014), Jagannadh stated that he planned to make a film based solely on family values in his next venture with Godavari shores and regional backdrop. B. V. S. N. Prasad was expected to produce this film under the Sri Venkateswara Cine Chitra banner. He went to Bangkok at the end of March 2014 to write the story of this project.

Bandla Ganesh was confirmed to produce the film under the Parameswara Art Productions banner. When Jagannadh was about to begin work on the film, Rama Rao Jr. asked him to listen to a point narrated by Vamsi to him four years back, and the former agreed, saying that he would definitely do the film if it is better than his story. Jagannadh chose to direct the script written by Vamsi in mid-May 2014 which marked the former's first film whose story was not written by him. The script work was in progress by late May 2014 and the film was declared a cop drama.

In late June 2014, Devi Sri Prasad was selected as the music director of the film while the cast and crew were being finalised. The film was confirmed to be launched officially on 1 August 2014 at Jagannadh's new office Cave at 7:00 AM. Shyam K. Naidu was named as cinematographer, S. R. Sekhar was named as editor, Brahma Kadali was named as art director while FEFSI Vijayan was recruited to compose the fights.

Devi Sri Prasad was replaced by Anoop Rubens later for unknown reasons while Mani Sharma was selected for composing the background score while Anoop Rubens composed the soundtrack. The titles Kummutha, Kummestha, Rubabu, Temper, Nenorakam with the tagline "Totally Corrupted" and Shamsher were considered by the makers and Temper was finalised and announced on 19 November 2014. The film was rumoured to be facing financial troubles in December 2014.

Casting 

Kajal Aggarwal was selected as the heroine of this film in early June 2013 pairing with Rama Rao Jr. after two successful films Brindavanam (2010) and Baadshah (2013) whose inclusion was confirmed by Jagannadh in a statement to the media after few days. Ajaz Khan was signed as the antagonist of the film in July 2014. On the day of launch, it was confirmed that Prakash Raj, Madhuurima, Ali, Kota Srinivasa Rao and Posani Krishna Murali would play important roles along with Tanikella Bharani, Subbaraju, Vennela Kishore, Jaya Prakash Reddy, Sapthagiri, Ramaprabha, Pavithra Lokesh and Kovai Sarala. Aggarwal had shortage of bulk dates to accommodate and it was rumoured that Tamannaah or a new actress would replace her.

Ganesh denied those rumours and confirmed Aggarwal's inclusion. Though initially planned to shoot simultaneously for a film by Sudhir Mishra, Aggarwal opted to continue with this film due to certain problems with Mishra's script. S. Sreesanth and Zarine Khan were speculated to be a part of the film's cast when they visited Jagannath's Cave but there was no official confirmation then. Naveena was reported to be considered for a small role. Impressed with his previous works, Jagannadh cast Sapthagiri for a special comedy role in the film. Nora Fatehi replaced Shruti Haasan in an item number. Jagannadh immediately selected her after her intense training to prepare for her role as a commando in the film Roar: Tigers of the Sundarbans (2014).

R. Narayana Murthy was approached for a special character in the film opposite Rama Rao Jr. Murthy liked the role but declined it as he did not want to move to mainstream cinema and was content making left-oriented films. Sonia Agarwal was signed on to play a significant role in the film. Apoorva Srinivasan was cast for a small yet crucial supporting role marking her debut in Telugu cinema. Junaid Sheikh was selected to play a negative role.

Characters and looks 
N. T. Rama Rao Jr. was reported to be seen as a tough and eccentric police officer in this film. Regarding her character in the film, Madhuurima said that she plays a crucial role which is the turning point in the film. She later added that her role is a small one that changes the course of the protagonist's character graph. Aggarwal was confirmed to play the role of an animal lover in this film. For his role, Rama Rao Jr. hired a new trainer who specialises in improving muscle tone and shed few kilograms relying on high protein diet and workout routine to build a hefty body. He also sported a crew cut. A few still images of the film were leaked online on 26 November 2014 which confirmed Rama Rao Jr.'s look in the film.

Those stills were captured during the shoot at Goa, and they went viral on social networking sites. However, the makers tried to find out who leaked it online as they wanted the pictures to be released to create a buzz before the film's launch. Another still was leaked on the next day which featured Rama Rao Jr. sitting on a Royal Enfield bike sans shirt sporting his six pack abs. The image was a working still taken on the beach, reportedly featuring in a song sequence of the film. However, none from the film's unit made a statement about the alleged leak.

Rama Rao Jr.'s underwent a drastic physical transformation from head to toe in hairdo, costumes, body and attitude for this role. His stylist Ashwin Mawle shopped for the costumes and accessories from designer stores in Hong Kong and London. Regarding the styling, Ashwin further revealed, "For the hair, we tried getting a few variations of spikes — straight, cross and messy. He (Rama Rao Jr.) keeps a tab on the latest trends. He took a lot of references from latest runway looks and zeroed in on an earthy color palette: brown, burgundy and grey. Thick jackets make him look bulkier, so he has gone for slim fit shirts and jackets made of linen" in an interview with Sasidhar AS of The Times of India. He added that N. T. Rama Rao Jr. trimmed his mustache for sporting a rugged look.

Madhuurima said in an interview to Suresh Kavirayani of Deccan Chronicle that she participated in few action sequences with Rama Rao Jr. in the film and added that she has no songs with him. Rama Rao Jr.'s character was named Daya and he was shown as a sub inspector of police who by his own admission is ruthless, fully corrupted, criminal minded and 100% cunning. For a particular scene where he had to walk with bare chest, Rama Rao Jr. skipped drinking a glass of water for 18 hours continuously. Aggarwal said in an interview to IANS that her character would become the reason for the transformation in the protagonist's character after she forces him to take up an issue. Posani Krishna Murali was seen in the role of a sincere constable who hates Daya because of his corrupt nature.

Filming 

The regular shooting was planned to commence in April 2014. In mid-May 2014, the film's shooting schedules were planned in July 2014. On 1 July 2014 it was declared that the film's shoot would be completed in 100 working days. Principal photography began on 2 August 2014. Madhuurima joined the film's sets on 9 August. N. T. Rama Rao Jr. was expected to join the film's sets on 11 August though he joined on 21 August in the Aluminium Factory at Gachibowli in Hyderabad. Few comedy scenes were shot on Rama Rao Jr., Vennela Kishore and other supporting cast after a week. The film's second schedule was planned from 10 September till the completion of the film's shoot which was postponed to 15 September because of disruption in construction of a large police station set due to rainfall.

After being rumoured that the film might be shelved after the shooting was stopped midway, Bandla Ganesh has clarified that the shooting would continue from 26 September and the shooting resumed in Aluminium Factory at Gachibowli in Hyderabad, and the makers announced that the schedule would continue till the end of the principal photography. The makers selected a house in Begumpet to erect a special police station set to shoot few crucial scenes on which 2.7 million was invested. An item number on Rama Rao Jr. and Nora Fatehi was shot in Hyderabad in early October 2014. That song was a fast-paced folk song choreographed by Shekhar which Nora termed a "hyper energetic dance number".

25% of the film's shoot was wrapped up by then and the next schedule was planned in Visakhapatnam. Later the makers chose Goa to shoot major parts of the film. Few scenes on Rama Rao Jr., Aggarwal and some other actors were shot meanwhile. The film's Goa schedule was delayed due to the ongoing strike for Non-acceptance of the revised pay hike for the Film Federation Employees. The strike was called off later and the filming continued from 25 October at Goa where major part of the film was shot. The shoot of the interval block was wrapped up by 2 November. Few key scenes on Rama Rao Jr., Aggarwal and Prakash Raj were shot later. The Goa schedule came to an end on 24 November and the team returned to Hyderabad the next day. The next schedule started at Ramoji Film City from 27 November. By then, 80% of the film's shoot was complete.

The film's shoot was disrupted again due to another strike caused by Film Federation Employees to appoint those technicians who have a membership in the Federation. The makers said that two weeks of filming is pending which would start immediately once the strike is called off. However, the film's shoot was reported to be progressing in Hyderabad with employees other than the ones from Federation being employed. The strike was called off on 5 December 2014 and the union members took part in the shootings from the next day. Bandla Ganesh called off the film's shoot for 10 days as Rama Rao Jr. was devastated because of the death of his step brother Nandamuri Janakiram. However Rama Rao Jr. chose to continue for ensuring a Sankranthi release and the filming resumed on 10 December 2014.

16 days of shoot was reported to be pending and the filming was expected to come to an end on 31 December 2014. Meanwhile, Rama Rao Jr. participated in the shoot of some important jail and court scenes at a specially erected set in Aluminium Factory near Gachibowli. Puri Jagannadh informed Bandla Ganesh that the film cannot be completed as planned and that film will not be ready for a Sankranti release. The latter was fine with the decision and gave a break to Rama Rao Jr. The filming resumed from 27 December 2014 in Hyderabad. Scenes on Rama Rao Jr. and others were shot in a police station set and court room set erected in Begumpet. The last song was shot on Rama Rao Jr. and Aggarwal in late January 2015. The entire filming came to an end on 31 January 2015.

Post-production 
S. R. Sekhar simultaneously completed the editing work so that the film can release on time. Post-production activities progressed in tandem with the filming during the film's shoot at Goa. Mani Sharma began composing the background score on 4 December 2014. The film's dubbing activities began on 9 December 2014 at Hyderabad. Rama Rao Jr. and the film's cast began dubbing for their roles on 4 February 2015. The pending DTS mixing and Rama Rao Jr.'s dubbing were completed by 7 February 2015. Mani Sharma was completing the rerecording work at the same time and the final copy was planned to be sent to Central Board of Film Certification for censoring on 9 February 2015. The censoring activities were postponed by a day due to unavailability of slot for censor and delay of final mixing. The special screening for the board began at 4:00 PM. The board passed the film with an 'U/A' certificate. The film's final length after censoring was 147 minutes and 18 cuts were made in the film including the reduction of the climax by 30%.

Themes and influences 
In an interview with Subhash K. Jha for the newspaper Absolute India, Puri Jagannadh said that the film is basically the story of a bad police officer played by Rama Rao Jr. and is an action-oriented film. He added later that the film about a highly corrupt and cunning police officer who later transforms into an honest one and the title of the film signifies the protagonist's character has attitude, arrogance and is defiant. He added that the film has a novel theme and is not inspired by anyone in real life. A source from the film's unit revealed that the confrontation scene in the courtroom was shot on the lines of a similar scene from the film Bobbili Puli (1982) and features N. T. Rama Rao Jr. delivering dialogues that ridicule the contemporary judicial system and police hierarchy.

Music 

Anup Rubens was signed in on to compose the film's soundtrack album after Rama Rao Jr. insisted Jagannadh to bring a relatively new music composer on board when the latter opted for Devi Sri Prasad. It consists of six songs all composed by Rubens and penned by Bhaskarabhatla, Kandikonda and Viswa. Rahul Kumar, mostly known as Roll Rida, rapped for the songs. The soundtrack was marketed by Aditya Music and was released on 28 January 2015 to positive reviews from critics.

Release 
The film was initially planned for a worldwide theatrical release on 9 January 2015 as a Sankranthi release. The film's release was postponed from Sankranthi to a later date due to halt in the film's shoot post Nandamuri Janakiram's death and an official confirmation was awaited. Later the film was expected to release in February 2015. The release date was speculated as 13 February 2015 and an official confirmation was awaited. Rama Rao Jr. was expected to announce the film's release date at the audio launch event.

Bandla Ganesh announced at the audio launch that the film would release worldwide on 13 February 2015 at 05:07 AM. 90 theatres were booked in Karnataka for the film's release which is a big number for any Telugu film. Great India Films was expected to release the film in 125 screens across the overseas markets. The film was expected to release in 1500 theatres across the world. Advance booking of tickets began on 10 February and the tickets for the first day in AP/Nizam were sold out completely while Bangalore and Chennai witnessed an advance booking of 50% each within a day.

One of the benefit shows were held at Mallikarjuna 70 MM theatre in KPHB colony at 4:00 AM. The other benefit show was held at Sreeramulu 70 MM theatre in Moosapet at 5:00 AM. The ticket rates of these benefit shows ranged between 2000 - 5000 each. The film released in Japan on 28 February 2015.

Distribution 
N. T. Rama Rao Jr. and Puri Jagannadh acquired the distribution rights of Nizam region and Visakhapatnam. Great India Films announced in mid-January 2015 that they acquired the overseas distribution rights of the film. It was their third and fifth film with Puri Jagannadh and Rama Rao Jr. in overseas respectively. DBB Films announced later that they acquired the distribution and theatrical screening rights of the film in Europe except United Kingdom, whose theatrical screening rights were acquired by Colours Media later. Sumanth Sunkara acquired the distribution rights of the film in Canada.

The film's distribution rights for different regions have been sold for an amount of 424 million, out of which the highest amount was received from Nizam region rights which were bought by Suresh Movies with an advance of 110 million followed by overseas rights for an amount of 630 million and followed by Ceded region rights bought by Siva Shakti films for an amount of 60 million. Anu Sri films and Suresh Movies acquired the East and West Godavari districts' distribution rights for an amount of 25.2 million and 230 million respectively. The distribution rights of Guntur and Nellore districts were acquired by S Creations and Icon for an amount of 330 million and 12.5 million plus 4 million advance respectively. Alankar Pictures offered 30 million advance while Hari Pictures offered 24.5 million for Krishna district rights on an NRA basis. Brunda Associates acquired Karnataka distribution rights for 45 million while SPI acquired Tamil Nadu distribution rights. North India distribution rights were sold for 5 million.

Marketing 
On 19 May 2014, 2 posters of this film bearing the title Production no. 5 were released wishing N. T. Rama Rao Jr. a happy birthday in advance. The makers planned to reveal the film's first look teaser on Diwali. The makers later decided to unveil the film's first look poster on 29 November and teaser on 5 December. Bandla Ganesh unveiled the official logo of the film's title on 27 November. Puri Jagannadh unveiled two posters featuring Rama Rao Jr. on the same day. Another poster featuring Rama Rao Jr. was unveiled on 6 December 2014. In that poster, he was seen sporting a sky blue cotton shirt, white cargo pants and aviator sunglasses during the film's shoot at Goa. He posted the autographed version of the same in his official Facebook page a day before which received 30 thousand likes, 2 thousand shares and more than 1 thousand comments upon its release; all of them being positive.

The film's trailer was expected to be unveiled on or after 17 December 2014. A new still of Rama Rao Jr. was unveiled on 29 December 2014. The first look teaser was unveiled on 1 January 2015. Two posters featuring Rama Rao Jr. were unveiled on the same day. The teaser was successful and the theatrical trailer of 1 minute duration was planned to be unveiled on the eve of Sankranthi. A poster featuring Rama Rao Jr. was unveiled on 24 January 2015. Six audio release posters all featuring Rama Rao Jr. were unveiled on 27 January 2015. Another poster featuring Rama Rao Jr. and Aggarwal was unveiled on the same day. A set of five stills featuring the lead pair and another five stills featuring Rama Rao Jr. were released on the next day.

The theatrical trailer with a duration of 116 seconds was unveiled on the night of 28 January 2015 at the audio launch. It received 0.25 million views, 3000 likes, 250 dislikes and more than 250 comments within 12 hours of its release in YouTube and received mixed feedback from the audience. Deccan Chronicle opined that the trailer promised action and entertainment and would leave the audience asking for more. Oneindia Entertainment wrote "As the trailer depicts him as a police officer, a dancer, a lover and a comedian and thus on a whole, Temper can be told as Jr. NTR in & as", adding that the trailer raised expectations. IndiaGlitz stated "NTR looks very different and stylish compared to his previous films and he has even changed his body language and dialogue delivery. If the trailer is anything to go by, the film has plenty of action sequences and Puri mark witty dialogues. NTR fans are in for a treat." In contrast, Subramanian Harikumar of Bollywood Life stated "The obsession for cop roles amongst Telugu filmmakers is refusing to die down, as Jr NTR plays corrupt sub inspector Daya. Overall, Temper seems like it is the same run of the mill action entertainer, which would appeal to die hard Jr NTR fans and nothing more". Meanwhile, the video promo of the item number Ittage Rechchipodam crossed more than 90 thousand views on the official channel in YouTube within 24 hours of its release. The dance moves of Rama Rao Jr. and Nora Fatehi received praise.

The 40 second video promo of the song Temper received praise particularly for Rama Rao Jr.'s dance movements. The theatrical trailer crossed half a million views within 18 hours of its release in YouTube. It crossed a million views on 1 February 2015 in Puri Jagannadh's official channel on YouTube making it one of the record breaking Telugu film trailers in YouTube. The video promo of the song One More Time received positive response. Six new stills featuring Rama Rao Jr. along with a set of working stills were released on 4 February 2015. 60 stills were released by the makers later; most of them featured Rama Rao Jr. in stylish looks and a few of them featuring the roles played by the remaining star cast.

Home media 
The film satellite rights were sold for an amount of 77.5 million to an undisclosed leading channel thus beating the record set by Rama Rao Jr.'s previous film Rabhasa (2014). The television broadcast rights were sold to Gemini TV for an amount of 78 million who faced a stiff competition from MAA TV.

Novelisation
Two years after the film's release, the film's writer Vakkantham Vamsi adapted the film as a novel in English which was released in April 2017.

Reception

Critical reception 
The film received positive reviews from critics. Y. Sunita Chowdary of The Hindu praised Rama Rao Jr.'s performance as one of his finest works and added "The strength of the story lies in Puri Jagan’s clarity, at no moment he is in a hurry or tempted to show the hero’s softer side. What this film needed desperately was personality and character and this time it gets both". IBN Live called it the best work of Rama Rao Jr. after Rakhi (2006) and added "Although the film isn't targeted mainly at family audience due to overtly dealt perverted ideas, Temper can be a best watch for Nandamuri Fans". Hemanth Kumar of The Times of India gave the film 3.5 out of 5 stars and praised Rama Rao Jr.'s performance and the film's underlying theme. He wrote "In the end, Temper comes across as a film which was meant for NTR to reinvent himself, for Puri to prove that he hasn't lost his mojo yet, for NTR's fans, whose unflinching faith in the actor hasn't diminished at all".

Pravallika Anjuri of Oneindia Entertainment gave the film 3.5 out of 5 stars and stated "It is surely a brave attempt by the team to opt a script like this. Temper deals with a sensitive story and yet conveyed it with all the commercial elements that are needed for a film to click." IndiaGlitz too gave 3.25 out of 5 stars and summarised "All in all, this one has emotion plus action, the former is the raison d' etre. Watch out for NTR. He is different and genuinely different here." Suresh Kavirayani of Deccan Chronicle gave the film 3 out of 5 stars. He praised the performances of Rama Rao Jr. and Prakash Raj and termed the film as one of the best films of the former's and also his ideal comeback. Subramanian Harikumar of Bollywood Life gave the film 3 out of 5 stars and stated "Temper is one of those films which ride high on actor’s performances and this film is a Jr NTR show from start to finish. Go in with minimum expectations and get ready to be mesmerised by NTR magic."

In contrast, Haricharan Pudipeddi of IANS gave the film 3 out of 5 stars and termed Temper a regular Puri Jagannadh film salvaged by Rama Rao Jr.'s performance which he called a "terrific" one. Behindwoods gave the film 2.25 out of 5 stars and stated "A thin one-liner made into a film with underused artists and a disengaging screenplay! Thanks to the well-known faces, reasonable songs and Junior NTR's dance, Temper becomes bearable."

Box office 
After including collections from Karnataka, Tamil Nadu, Maharashtra, other parts of North India and international markets apart from AP/Nizam area, the first day total at the global box office stood approximately at 15 crore and became the biggest opener of Rama Rao Jr. after breaking the previous record set by Baadshah (2013). The film's trade witnessed around 50 per cent drop in the morning shows on its second day and improvements in the later shows and collected 6.5 crore taking its two-day global box office total to approximately 22 crore. Apart from AP/Nizam, the film collected 3.5 crore in other areas and the three day i.e. first weekend global box office total stood at 37.4 crore.

The film's business witnessed a 70 percent drop on its fourth day and collected 2.5 crore and showed improvement on the next day which was Maha Shivaratri and collected 3.25 crore taking its five-day global total to 33.93 crore. Trade Analyst Trinath told IANS that the film grossed 40 crore in six days. By the end of its first week, the film collected 38 crore nett at the global box office and its distributors recovered 90 percent of their investments on the film by then. The film stood in the fifth place in the list of highest grossing Telugu film at the global box office in the first week and overtook Gopala Gopala, Race Gurram (2014), Baadshah and Gabbar Singh (2012).

Temper lost many screens across the world due to new releases Bandipotu and Gayakudu and a couple of dubbed films because of which it witnessed a huge drop in its business. The film collected 2.5 crore on its eighth day at the global box office taking its eight-day total to 40.5 crore. The film's business later witnessed a growth as the new releases received mixed reviews. It collected 46.5 crore nett by the end of its ten-day run at the global box office with which the film overtook the second week collection of Govindudu Andarivadele (2014) and the lifetime collections of Gopala Gopala. The film witnessed a huge drop in its business due to new film releases and 2015 Cricket World Cup. It collected 49.5 crore nett in 14 days at the global box office.

By the end of its 20-day run, the film crossed 60 crore mark by grossing 66.75 crore and collected a distributor share of 40.39 crore. The film completed its 50-day run across several centres on 3 April 2015. In its lifetime, the film grossed 74.3 crore and collected a share of 43.1 crore and was declared a profitable film for its distributors on a whole.

India 
The film collected a share of 9.68 crore at AP/Nizam box office and became the biggest opener for both Rama Rao Jr. in his career and Telugu cinema in 2015. It overtook the opening day collections of Gopala Gopala at AP/Nizam box office thus emerging as the third highest opener of all time there. It collected 1.1 crore from 125 shows at Bangalore box office on its first day. It collected 4 crore at AP/Nizam box office on its second day and its two-day AP/Nizam box office total stood at a share of 13.68 crore. It collected 4.5 crore at AP/Nizam box office on its third day taking its three-day total to a share of 16.72 crore breaking the opening weekend record of Gopala Gopala. The film continued a steady run on its sixth day collecting 1.78 crore at AP/Nizam box office.

The film collected approximately a share of 24.52 crore at AP/Nizam box office in its first week. The film collected a share of 9.7 crore in ten days in Nizam region making Temper the biggest grosser of Rama Rao Jr. in that area beating the lifetime collections of his previous films Rabhasa (2014), Ramayya Vasthavayya (2013), Brindavanam (2010) and Dammu (2012), which collected 6.9 crore, 8.9 crore, 8.3 crore and 8.2 crore respectively in Nizam region in their lifetime. However it failed to break the records set by Race Gurram and Govindudu Andarivadele in Nizam region. The film grossed 39.2 crore and collected a share of 27.25 crore in ten days at AP/Nizam box office and topped the business charts in that area followed by Bandipotu and Badlapur.

The film grossed 44 crore and collected a share of 29.02 crore at AP/Nizam box office by the end of its 20-day run. The film continued to stand in the first spot in the weekend business charts of AP/Nizam box office followed by Maga Maharaju, Pisachi, Ram Leela and Badlapur. The film grossed 5.85 crore and collected a share of 2.45 crore at Bangalore box office while the share and gross in the rest of Karnataka were reported as a share of 2.3 crore and 4.8 crore respectively. The film grossed 3.6 crore and collected 1.4 crore in the rest of India, including Tamil Nadu. The film grossed 50.6 crore and collected 31.35 crore at AP/Nizam box office in its lifetime. The lifetime gross and share figures at Karnataka, Tamil Nadu, and the rest of India stood at 11.5 crore and 5.1 crore, 1.4 crore and 0.55 crore, 2.2 crore and 0.85 crore respectively.

Overseas 
Taran Adarsh reported that the film collected US$256,834 on Thursday preview shows, US$228,779 on its first day, US$203,794 on its second day and US$163,395 on the third day at the United States box office taking its opening weekend total to US$852,802 in the country. It was equivalent to 5.3 crore and Adarsh called it a "flying start". It performed better than the other releases Roy and Anegan which collected US$133,453 and US$105,070 equivalent to 0.83 crore and 0.653 crore respectively. The film was expected to cross the US$1 million mark soon. The film collected US$934,467 in six days at the United States box office which was equivalent to 5.82 crore and was declared Rama Rao Jr.'s biggest success in the country.

The film collected US$23,000 each on 20 and 21 February 2015 at the United States box office and crossed the US$1 million mark by collecting US$10,05,000 in 10 days. With this, Temper became Rama Rao Jr.'s second film to cross the US$1 million mark after Baadshah and also the first Indian film in 2015 to cross that mark. The lifetime gross and share figures at the United States stood at 6.6 crore and 4.25 crore respectively. The film grossed 2 crore and collected a share of 1 crore in its lifetime in other international markets.

Accolades

Sequel and remakes 
Bandla Ganesh announced the film's sequel titled Temper 2 on 14 February 2015 through his Twitter page. Its feasibility was doubted as Jagannadh shelved the sequels of his films Pokiri (2006) and Businessman (2012) in the past. Sachiin J. Joshi announced that he would bankroll the Tamil and Hindi remakes of the film under his banner Viiking Media & Entertainment Pvt Ltd. Ganesh reportedly sold those rights to Joshi as a part of the compensation to money he owed to him when the latter financed the former's production Govindudu Andarivadele (2014). Dharma Productions later acquired the remake rights for Hindi, but the version titled Simmba (2018) was, according to its director Rohit Shetty, only a partial remake of Temper. The film was also remade in Tamil as Ayogya (2019). Despite remakes, the film was later dubbed and released in Tamil and Kannada, both under the title Inspector Daya, and also in Hindi under the same title.

References

External links 
 

2015 films
2010s Telugu-language films
Films shot in Hyderabad, India
Indian crime action films
2015 masala films
Fictional portrayals of the Andhra Pradesh Police
Films directed by Puri Jagannadh
Films scored by Anoop Rubens
Telugu films remade in other languages
Indian police films
Films shot in Visakhapatnam
Films about rape in India
Films shot at Ramoji Film City
2015 action films
2010s police films
Films set in Visakhapatnam
Films set in Andhra Pradesh
Films shot in Andhra Pradesh